VNIISS is a rural locality (a settlement) in Aydarovskoye Rural Settlement, Ramonsky District, Voronezh Oblast, Russia. The population was 2,286 as of 2010. There are 18 streets.

Geography 
VNIISS is located 3 km northwest of Ramon (the district's administrative centre) by road. Aydarovo is the nearest rural locality.

References 

Rural localities in Ramonsky District